Peter Fonagy,  (born 14 August 1952) is a Hungarian-born British psychoanalyst and clinical psychologist. He studied clinical psychology at University College London. He is a Professor of Contemporary Psychoanalysis and Developmental Science Head of the Division of Psychology and Language Sciences at University College London, Chief Executive of the Anna Freud Centre, and a training and supervising analyst in the British Psycho-Analytical Society in child and adult analysis. His clinical interests center on issues of borderline psychopathology, violence, and early attachment relationships. His work attempts to integrate empirical research with psychoanalytic theory. He has published over 500 papers, and 270 chapters and has authored 19 and edited 17 books.

Career 
Fonagy is a Fellow of the British Academy, the Faculty of Medical Sciences, the Academy of Social Sciences, and a registrant of the BPC. He was appointed twice as a Senior Investigator by the National Institute for Health and Care Research (NIHR).

Fonagy was appointed Officer of the Order of the British Empire (OBE) in the 2013 Birthday Honours for services to psychoanalysis and clinical psychology and received the Wiley Prize of the British Academy for Lifetime Achievements.

Contemporary psychoanalysis 
Fonagy received the Otto Weininger Memorial Award for his contributions to the development of contemporary psychoanalysis. To this end, he has helped to improve the dialogue between analysts and cognitive therapists.  
Fonagy has played and still plays a major role in the evaluation of psychotherapy research. The evaluation of his research is (mostly) based on the effectiveness of treatment. Evaluation of treatment has led to review, recommendations, and implications of psychotherapy. Fonagy has offered detailed evidence for the efficacy of psychological interventions for mental disorders and for special populations, including medical and psychosocial therapies for children and young people and psychological therapies for borderline personality disorder.

Mentalization 
In their award-winning book Affect Regulation, Mentalization and the Development of the Self, Fonagy and his colleagues put forth a detailed theory for the way in which the abilities to mentalise and to regulate effect can determine an individual's successful development. They define mentalisation as the ability to make and use mental representations of their own and other people's emotional states. The authors discuss the ways in which bad and insufficient parenting, leading to certain attachment styles, can leave children unable to modulate and interpret their own feelings, as well as the feelings of others. These inabilities to mentalize and regulate effect have implications for severe personality disorders, as well as general psychological problems of self-confidence, and sense of self.

Mentalization-based treatment 

Fonagy is particularly interested in borderline personality disorder (BPD), which was for a long time assumed to be treatment-resistant. He and Anthony Bateman proposed a new way to treat BPD in their book Psychotherapy for borderline personality disorder: mentalization-based treatment. Mentalization-based treatment (MBT), rooted in attachment theory, is based on the idea that people with borderline personality disorder mainly lack a reliable capacity to mentalize, which is caused by an absence of contingent and marked mirroring during development.
The primary goals of treatment are to improve mentalization skills, make connections between the inner experience of relationships and the actual representation, learn how to work with current emotions and how to establish real relationships.  In this way, they could form a more coherent sense of self and develop new (secure) attachment styles.

See also
Psychic equivalence

References

Works

1952 births
Living people
British psychologists
British socialists
Hungarian socialists
Hungarian psychologists
British psychoanalysts
Hungarian psychoanalysts
Alumni of University College London
Academics of University College London
Officers of the Order of the British Empire
Physicians from Budapest
Hungarian emigrants to the United Kingdom
Fellows of the Academy of Medical Sciences (United Kingdom)
Borderline personality disorder experts
Fellows of the British Academy
Fellows of the Academy of Social Sciences
NIHR Senior Investigators
Naturalised citizens of the United Kingdom